Promi Big Brother 2022, also known as Promi Big Brother 10 and as the anniversary season, is the tenth season of the German reality television series Promi Big Brother. The show began airing on 18 November 2022 on Sat.1 and will end after 22 days on 7 December 2022. It is the tenth celebrity season and the eleventh season of Big Brother in total to air on Sat.1 to date. Jochen Schropp and Marlene Lufen both returned as hosts of the show.

Production
The tenth season uses a mock garage, an attic and a luxurious loft as sets. The garage and attic areas do not include an outdoor area, but a separate smoking area. Initial speculation that the tenth season could be about football turned out to be deliberate false reports for marketing purposes as part of the 2022 FIFA World Cup in Qatar, which was taking place at the same time.

Opening Intro
The song of this year's intro and outro is "Es geht um Alles" from Michael Wolfschmidt.

Spin-off shows

Die Late Night Show
The live late-night show with the name Die Late Night Show returned and will air every day after the main show on Sat.1. Jochen Bendel and Melissa Khalaj returned as hosts of the late-night show. Special guests joined the presenter duo to analyze the situation of the show and it also features exclusive live broadcasts from the house.

Special guests

Housemates

Loft, Garage and Attic

Reasons

 : Rainer lost in the Duel Arena and moved in the Loft area. Then the viewers voted for Jay to move in the Garage area.
 : Diana lost in the Duel Arena and moved in the Loft area. Then the viewers voted for Katy to move in the Garage area.
 : Tanja lost in the Duel Arena and moved in the Loft area. Then the viewers voted for Jörg K. to move in the Garage area.
 : Menderes lost in the Duel Arena and moved in the Loft area. Then the viewers voted for Jennifer and Sam to move in the Garage area.
 : Big Brother decided to move Diana, Menderes, Rainer and Tanja in the Attic area. Jeremy won in the Duel Arena and moved in the Loft area, while Walentina, who lost in the Duel Arena and moved in the Garage area.
 : The viewers voted for Micaela to move in the Loft area. Jennifer won in the Duel Arena and moved in the Loft area and Walentina, who lost in the Duel Arena, moved in the Attic area.
 : Doreen won in the Duel Arena and moved in the Loft area and Sam, who lost in the Duel Arena, moved in the Attic area.
 : Big Brother decided to move everyone from the Attic area in the Garage area. The viewers voted for Katy to move in the Loft area.
 : The housemates in the Loft area decided for Sam to move in the Loft area. The viewers voted for Catrin to move in the Garage area.
 : The housemates in the Loft area decided for Walentina to move in the Loft area. The viewers voted for Sam and Walentina to move in the Garage area.
 : The housemates in the Loft area decided for Jay to move in the Loft area. The viewers voted for Doreen and Micaela to move in the Garage area.
 : Big Brother decided to move everyone from the Garage area in the Loft area.
 : Jörg K., Rainer, Menderes, Sam and Jennifer lost in the Duel Arena and moved in the Garage area.
 : Big Brother decided to move everyone from the Loft area in the Garage area.

Duel Arena 
 Housemates from the Loft
 Housemates from the Garage
 Housemates from the Attic

Area Exchange

 : The loser had to leave the Garage area and was allowed to move to the Loft area, which the other residents did not know. The others remain in the Garage area.
 : Jörg D. as team captain had to decide who had to move in the Garage area. He chose Tanja.
 : Jeremy, as the winner of the duel, was allowed to move to the Loft area. Valentina moved to the Garage area.
 : The winner had to leave the Garage area and was allowed to move to the Loft area, while the loser had to leave the Garage area and was allowed to move to the Attic area. The others remain in the Garage area.
 : The viewers could vote one from the winners, to move in the Loft area.

Supermarket Purchases
The Penny market, which is part of a Product placement, once again serves as a supermarket where the housemates of the poor area can shop on a budget. The housemates have the budget of 1€ per person per day per shopping. The remainder money does not carry over to the next day. Occasionally, they also have a chance to earn more money from Duels.

References

External links
Official Homepage

2022 German television seasons
10